Edward F. Hansen was a member of the Wisconsin State Assembly.

Biography
Hansen was born on October 7, 1860 in Beloit, Wisconsin. Jobs he held include machinist. Hansen was affiliated with Congregationalism. On May 29, 1895, he married Carrie A. Ross. He died in November 1929.

His twin brother, William O. Hansen, was also a member of the Assembly.

Political career
Hansen was a member of the Assembly during the 1895 session. Other positions he held include alderman, city treasurer and city clerk of Beloit. He was a Republican.

References

External links

Politicians from Beloit, Wisconsin
Republican Party members of the Wisconsin State Assembly
Wisconsin city council members
City and town treasurers in the United States
City and town clerks
American Congregationalists
20th-century Congregationalists
Machinists
1860 births
1929 deaths
Burials in Wisconsin